Salmond College is a residential college affiliated to the University of Otago in Dunedin, New Zealand. As an affiliated college, it is privately owned and is run independently from the university, being governed by The Council of Knox College and Salmond College, a body with links to the Presbyterian Church of Aotearoa New Zealand. The college was opened in 1971 as Salmond Hall, originally to accommodate women students, to parallel the male-only facility Knox College. It became a coeducational facility during the 1970s. The name was changed to Salmond College in 2006.

Salmond and Knox share different parts of the same 4.57 hectare landscaped site (11 acres), located on the north side of the Dunedin Botanic Gardens, close to the area known simply as The Gardens Corner at the foot of North East Valley, approximately 15 minutes walk north of the campus. The site was originally the location for stables for Ross and Glendining Limited, and was donated by the Ross family.

The college predominantly provides for first year students, with 40-50 returning for a second year. 

The college was named after James Salmond, for many years a lecturer at Knox Theological Hall, and his sister Mary Salmond, Principal of the Presbyterian Church's Deaconess Training School in the 1950s.

The majority of students are housed in single rooms on one of the four levels in the main building. RLs, known at Salmond “Residential Leaders” are also students who live on site and mentor and support the first year residents.  Both the Head and Deputy Head of College reside on the premises. 

Facilities include a gym, computing facilities, tutorial rooms, a library, television/recreation areas, dining hall, chapel, car-parking, and secure cycle storage.

During the summer of 2014/2015 Salmond College was extensively refurbished, creating rooms for up to 261 residents. All bedrooms were be double glazed with new carpet and joinery throughout the College. The College introduced a key card system.

President of Salmond College for 2021 is Harry Tran. Harry, who hails from Hastings in Hawke's Bay, returns in 2020 having completed First Year Health Science in 2020 at the University of Otago. 

Salmond's motto which can be seen in the college crest is 'Gratia et Veritas', or 'Grace and Truth'. At the end of 2020 a whakatauākī was confirmed as a part of the mission statement for the college: Ko te toa i a tini, i a mano o te takata - It is the bravery of a multitude, of thousands of people. This Ngāi Tahu whakatauākī, attributed to Tū Whakauika & Te Oreorehua, refers to the strength of collectivity. As Salmond enters its 50th year in 2021, it reminds us of the power of a living community stretching back several generations, and fosters hope as we continue to grow a community with a shared identity.

References

External links
 Salmond College website

University residences in New Zealand
Buildings and structures of the University of Otago
1970s architecture in New Zealand